Loss may refer to:

Arts, entertainment, and media

Music
Loss (Bass Communion album) (2006)
Loss (Mull Historical Society album) (2001)
"Loss", a song by God Is an Astronaut from their self-titled album (2008)
Losses "(Lil Tjay song)" (2020)
"Losses", a song by Drake from Dark Lane Demo Tapes (2020)
"Losses", a song by Polo G from Hall of Fame (2021)

Other uses in arts, entertainment, and media
Loss (comic), a webcomic strip and internet meme
Loss (film), a 2008 film by Maris Martinsons
Lord Loss (character), a character from Darren Shan's The Demonata
"The Loss", a 1990 episode of Star Trek: The Next Generation

Grief
Grief, an emotional response to loss
Animal loss, grief over the loss of an animal

Mathematics, science, and technology
Angular misalignment loss, power loss caused by the deviation from optimum angular alignment
Bridging loss, the loss that results when an impedance is connected across a transmission line
Coupling loss, the loss that occurs when energy is transferred from one circuit, optical device, or medium to another
Insertion loss, the decrease in transmitted signal power resulting from the insertion of a device in a transmission line or optical fiber
Dielectric loss, a dielectric material's inherent dissipation of electromagnetic energy
Loss function, in statistics, a function representing the cost associated with an event
Path loss, the attenuation undergone by an electromagnetic wave in transit from a transmitter to a receiver
Free-space path loss, the loss in signal strength that would result if all influences were sufficiently removed having no effect on its propagation
Return loss, the ratio of the amplitude of the reflected wave to the amplitude of the incident wave
Round-trip loss in laser physics refers to energy lost due to scattering or absorption
, power loss incured due to circuit switching
Lick Observatory Supernova Search (LOSS) program

Other uses
Joe Loss (1909–1990), founder of The Joe Loss Orchestra
Loss (baseball), a pitching statistic in baseball
Pure economic loss
League of Secessionist States (LoSS), an intermicronational organisation

See also 

Attenuation, a reduction in amplitude and intensity of a signal
Lose (disambiguation)
Losing (disambiguation)
Stop loss (disambiguation)